Siempre En Mi Mente (English: Always on my mind) is the ninth studio album by Mexican singer-songwriter Juan Gabriel, originally released in 1978 and re-released on July 30, 1996. This was the last album by Juan Gabriel with the RCA label.

Track listing

References

External links 
Juan Gabriel official website
 Siempre En Mi Mente on amazon.com
[] Siempre En Mi Mente on allmusic.com

1978 albums
Juan Gabriel albums
RCA Records albums
Spanish-language albums